The 2018–19 season was Unione Calcio Sampdoria's 62nd season in Serie A, and their 7th consecutive season in the top-flight. The club competed in Serie A and in the Coppa Italia.

The season was the third in charge for coach Marco Giampaolo.

Players

Squad information

Appearances include league matches only

Transfers

In

Loans in

Out

Loans out

Competitions

Serie A

League table

Results summary

Results by round

Matches

Coppa Italia

Statistics

Appearances and goals

|-
! colspan=14 style=background:#dcdcdc; text-align:center| Goalkeepers

|-
! colspan=14 style=background:#dcdcdc; text-align:center| Defenders

|-
! colspan=14 style=background:#dcdcdc; text-align:center| Midfielders

|-
! colspan=14 style=background:#dcdcdc; text-align:center| Forwards

|-
! colspan=14 style=background:#dcdcdc; text-align:center| Players transferred out during the season

Goalscorers

Last updated: 26 May 2019

Clean sheets

Last updated: 26 May 2019

Disciplinary record

Last updated: 26 May 2019

References

U.C. Sampdoria seasons
Sampdoria